The Stazione Sperimentale per l'Industria delle Conserve Alimentari (SSICA) (Experimental Station for the Food Preserving Industry) is a special Agency of the Chamber of Commerce in Parma.
It is an Institute for applied research, established in Parma in 1922, and operating on a national scale with the specific aim of promoting the technical and technological progress in the food preserving industry. In 1999 SSICA was transformed into a public economic institution with important legal, operational and administrative modifications which, however, have left its mission and functions unchanged.

References

Other relative Experimental Stations
 Stazione Sperimentale per le Industrie degli Oli e dei Grassi
 Stazione Sperimentale per le Industrie delle Essenze e dei Derivati dagli Agrumi

External links
 Homepage of the SSICA 
 Publication for the ninetieth anniversary of the SSICA 

Experimental Stations for Industry in Italy
Parma